Elicio Berriz (c. 1820 – c. 1890) was a Spanish soldier and Mayor of Ponce, Puerto Rico, from 1 January 1869 to 11 May 1870. and again from 1 January 1872 until his mayoral assignment was passed to two Ponce municipal assemblymen, Francisco Arce y Romero and Alejandro Albizu, later that year. As a Spanish Army soldier, Berriz held the rank of Artillery Colonel.

First mayoral term (1869)
Berriz served as mayor from 1 January 1869 until 11 May 1870, when  Vicente Pérez Valdivieso started serving as mayor.  Berriz is best remembered as the military officer and mayor who, in 1869, sought the removal and destruction of the monument erected to honor the Spanish Constitution of 1812 that for many decades had been located at today's Plaza Degetau.

Second mayoral term (1872)
Berriz served again as mayor from 1 January 1872 until c. 31 January 1872. when Francisco Arce y Romero started his mayoral service.

See also
 List of mayors of Ponce, Puerto Rico

Notes

References

Further reading
 Ramon Marin. Las Fiestas Populares de Ponce. Editorial Universidad de Puerto Rico. 1994.

External links
 Guardia Civil española (c. 1898) (Includes military ranks in 1880s Spanish Empire.)

Mayors of Ponce, Puerto Rico
1820s births
1890s deaths
Year of birth uncertain
Year of death uncertain